The Israeli National Road Race Championships are held annually to decide the cycling champions in the road race discipline, across various categories. The winners of each event are awarded with a symbolic cycling jersey, just like the national flag, these colours can be worn by the rider at other road racing events in the country to show their status as national champion. The champion's stripes can be combined into a sponsored rider's team kit design for this purpose.

Men

Elite

Women

Elite

References

National road cycling championships
Cycle races in Israel
Recurring sporting events established in 1998